Fort Munro  (Urdu,), formerly known as Loilaresir, and Anari Mool in Balochi language, is a hill station which is located at a height of  above sea level  in D. G Khan District, Punjab, Pakistan. It was developed by British in the late 19th-century as a summer hill town. Named after commissioner Multan division Colonel (later Major-General) Munro.

It attracts many people for short stays during the hot summer. It is around 85 kilometres from Dera Ghazi Khan city, Punjab, Pakistan and about 185 kilometres from Multan in Sulaiman Mountain range. The people of Fort Munro are nomads, especially of the Leghari tribe.

Fort Munro's altitude is 1800 meters. It can be reached either from Loralai Balochistan or from Multan (Punjab). From Punjab, the mountain range starts near Rakhni, which is a border-post between Balochistan and Punjab.

History

Previously, it was known as Loilaresir before British established the area. The town was founded by Sir Robert Groves Sandeman in the later part of the 19th century and named Fort Munro after Colonel, later Major-General, Andrew Aldcorn Munro who was commissioner of the Derajat Division and Multan Division. Fort Munro was headquarters of commissioner of Multan in hot season during British period.

Sandeman Lodge, a colonial residence of political assistant (PA), the Commissioner House and DCO House were established at the hill to be used as a summer residence. A small Christian cemetery is also located near DCO House.

Geography and climate
Fort Munro is part of the Sulaiman Mountain range. The range is located in central Pakistan, extending southward about 280 miles (450 km) from the Gumal Pass to just north of Jacobabad, separating the Khyber Pakhtunkhwa and Punjab from Balochistan. Its heights gradually decrease toward the south, with summits averaging 6,000–7,000 feet,  the highest being the twin peaks (30 miles from the Gumal Pass) called Takht-i Sulaiman, or Solomon's Throne, which legend connects with King Solomon's visit to Pakistan; the higher of the peaks, at 18,481 feet (5,633 m), is the site of a Muslim Ziyarat (shrine) visited annually by many pilgrims. The range's eastern face dips steeply to the Indus River, but on the west the range declines more gradually. Juniper and edible pines abound in the north and olives in the centre, but vegetation is scarce in the south. The Ghat, Zao, Chuhar Khel Dhana, and Sakhi Sarwar are the principal passes in the north. In the south, west of Dera Ghazi Khan, lies the hill station of Fort Munro.

Tourism 

It attracts a number of tourists every year, particularly those who wish to escape from hot plains of southern Punjab to enjoy mild and pleasant weather for a day or two. The Punjab Government has released over Rs2 billion in July 2015 for the provision of basic facilities at the hill station in a bid to make it an important tourist haven. Out of the funds, Rs750 million would be spent on the installation of the chairlift and cable car facility between Fort Munro and Khar, Rs300 million on the provision of clean drinking water, Rs300 million on a wastewater treatment and drainage scheme, Rs1.60 billion on the construction of six new carpeted roads and a cadet college.

Additionally, state-of-the-art landscaping initiatives and the cultivation of cut flowers would also promote development in the region and open new avenues of employment. The Forest Department would afforest 300 acres in the hill station's vicinity. The Irrigation Department is also believed to have forwarded a proposal regarding the construction of six small dams in Fort Munro's vicinity. The development project, which is expected to kick off soon, to attract people from surrounding areas being the only hill station of southern Punjab in Dera Ghazi Khan district. Fort Munro is a cool resort in summers for the people living in south Punjab.

Many ill people come here for refreshment or convalescence.

See also
Munroe Island, an inland island in Kerala, India is named after a  different man, Maj-Gen. John Munro of Teaninich
List of UNESCO World Heritage Sites in Pakistan
List of forts in Pakistan
List of museums in Pakistan
Fort Monroe
Payala Lake Ghazi Ghat
Sheikh Badin

References

Dera Ghazi Khan District
Hill stations in Pakistan
Tourist attractions in Punjab, Pakistan